The 1979–80 South Pacific cyclone season saw mostly weak systems.



Seasonal summary

Systems

Tropical Cyclone Ofa 

Ofa was classified on December 9. For several days it slowly deepened and on December 12 attained peak intensity while moving eastward. Three days later Ofa was no more.

Severe Tropical Cyclone Peni 

Peni existed from January 1 to 6.

Tropical Cyclone Rae 

Rae lasted five days from February 2 to 7. It remained weak.

Severe Tropical Cyclone Sina 

During the opening days of March 1980, a broad trough of low pressure, extended from Vanuatu to Queensland, Australia. A tropical depression subsequently developed, along this trough during March 9, near Rennell Island in the Solomon Islands. Over the next few days the system initially moved south-eastwards into the Australian region, as it gradually developed further before it turned south-westwards towards the South Pacific during March 10. The Australian Bureau of Meteorology, subsequently reported that the depression, had developed into a tropical cyclone and named it Sina during March 11. The system subsequently moved south-eastwards and back into the South Pacific basin, where it continued to intensify and move south-eastwards. After the system had peaked, it accelerated south-eastwards while gradually weakened and transitioning into a cold cored low. The system impacted northern New Zealand during March 15, before it was last noted during the following day.

Tropical Cyclone Tia 

Tia affected Fiji and Tonga.

Tropical Cyclone Val 

Val affected Wallis and Futuna between March 25–29.

Tropical Cyclone Wally 

Wally lasted in the southern Pacific from April 1 to 7 and was a category one cyclone on the Australian tropical cyclone intensity scale with a peak pressure of 990 HpA/mbar. During its lifetime it made landfall on the second biggest island of Fiji – Viti Levu.

Other systems 
During January 9, the extratropical remnants of Tropical Cyclone Paul briefly moved into the region, before they moved back into the Australian region during the next day. The remnants subsequently moved back into the region during January 12, when they were last noted to the south of New Zealand's South Island. The precursor tropical depression to Severe Tropical Cyclone Simon, developed within the monsoon trough, to the northeast of New Caledonia during February 20. Over the next day the system moved eastwards and into the Australian region, where it ultimately developed into a severe tropical cyclone and impacted Queensland. During February 28, Simon's extratropical remnants moved back into the basin and impacted New Zealand, before they were last noted during March 3.

Season effects 
This table lists all the storms that developed in the South Pacific to the east of longitude 160°E during the 1979–80 season. It includes their intensity on the Australian tropical cyclone intensity scale, duration, name, landfalls, deaths, and damages. All data is taken from the archives of the Fiji Meteorological Service and MetService, and all of the damage figures are in 1980 USD.

|-
|  ||  || bgcolor=#|Category 2 tropical cyclone || bgcolor=#| || bgcolor=#| || Wallis and Futuna || || ||
|-
|  ||  || bgcolor=#|Category 3 severe tropical cyclone || bgcolor=#| || bgcolor=#| || Fiji || Minor || ||
|-
|  || || bgcolor=#|Category 1 tropical cyclone || bgcolor=#| || bgcolor=#| || Vanuatu || || ||
|-
|  || March 9–16 || bgcolor=#|Category 3 severe tropical cyclone || bgcolor=#| || bgcolor=#| || New Caledonia, New Zealand || || ||
|-
|  || March 22–27 || bgcolor=#|Category 2 tropical cyclone || bgcolor=#| || bgcolor=#| || Fiji || Moderate ||  ||
|-
|  || March 25–29 || bgcolor=#|Category 2 tropical cyclone || bgcolor=#| || bgcolor=#|
|-
|  ||  || bgcolor=#|Category 1 tropical cyclone || bgcolor=#| || bgcolor=#| || Fiji ||  ||  ||
|-

See also 

 Atlantic hurricane seasons: 1979, 1980
 Eastern Pacific hurricane seasons: 1979, 1980
 Western Pacific typhoon seasons: 1979, 1980
 North Indian Ocean cyclone seasons: 1979, 1980

References

External links 

 
South Pacific cyclone seasons
1980 SPAC